is a Keikyu station on the Keikyū Main Line between Tachiaigawa Station and Heiwajima Station. The station is on the borders of Shinagawa and Ota wards. Station number is KK07.

Layout 

The station consists of two platforms on an overhead railway. Elevators to connect platforms and concourse is set in March 2009. The station has name of "Ōmori", which usually indicates a part of the Ōta ward while the location of the stations is Shinagawa ward.

Entry and exit 
Average daily entry and exit in 2015 is 14,391.

Entry and exit in recent years are as shown below.

Nearby the station 
 Shinagawa-kumin Park
 Shinagawa Aquarium
 Isuzu hospital
 Minamiōi Library
 Suzugamori execution grounds ruin
Big Fun Heiwajima
 Boat Race Heiwajima
 Ito-Yokado Omori store
 Keikyu EX Inn
 Disco Corporation headquarters
 Omori Bell Port
 Omori Bell Port Post Office
 Isuzu Motors headquarters 
 Nismo Omori Factory

Transport Links 
 Keihin-Tōhoku Line Omori station – 10 minutes walk
 Japan National Route 15
 Suzugamori Ramp - Route 1 (Shuto Expressway)

Omori Kaigan Station  bus stop
 East bound
 Keikyu Bus
 <Mori 22> Yashio Park Town Loop
 <Mori 30> Museum of Maritime Science via Tokyo Teleport Station three services a day
 <Mori 28> Heiwajima loop
 <""I"" 19> Leisure land Heiwajima, three services a day
 <Mori 34> Ota Stadium via Leisure land Heiwajima
 <Mori 43> Ota Market
 <Mori 32> Jonanjima loop
 <Mori 24> Keihinjima loop
 <Mori 25> Showajima loop
 <Mori 36> Keihijima and Showajima loop
 <Mori 31> Ryutsu Centre loop
 <Mori 26> Morigasaki
Haneda Keikyu Bus
 <Mori 21> Haneda Airport
 <Mori 23> Haneda Garage
 West bound
 Keikyu bus
 <"I" 19> Ōimachi Station via Omori station, three services a day
 <Mori 22, Mori 24, Mori 25, Mori 26, Mori 28, Mori 31, Mori 32, Mori 36, Mori 43, and I 30> Omori station
 Haneda Keikyu bus
 <Mori 21 and Mori 23> Omori station

History 
On 1 February 1901, the station was opened as  when the Keihin Electric Railway extension line from Kawasaki to Ōmori Teishajōmae (by Ōmori Station) commenced the service. The branchline was active until 8 March 1937.

The current station name Ōmorikaigan is from 1 July 1933. On 1 December 1970, the work to move the station to the elevated line was completed.

Keikyu introduced station numbering to its stations on 21 October 2010; Ōmorikaigan was assigned station number KK07.

References 

Railway stations in Tokyo